Colchicaceae is a family of flowering plants that includes 15 genera with a total of about 285 known species according to Christenhusz and Byng in 2016.

Description
The family is characterized by the presence of colchicine.

Taxonomy
The APG III system, of 2009 (unchanged from the APG systems, of 1998 and 2003), recognizes this family and places it in the order Liliales, in the clade monocots. It is a group of herbaceous perennials with rhizomes or corms.

The Dahlgren system and the Thorne system (1992) also recognized this family, and placed it in order Liliales in superorder Lilianae in subclass Liliidae (monocotyledons) of class Magnoliopsida (angiosperms).

Genera
The following is an alphabetic list of genera usually included in this family :

The phylogenetic classification of Vinnersten & Manning circumscribes the family as follows:
 tribe Burchardieae
 Burchardia R.Br.
 tribe Uvularieae
 Disporum Salisb. (excluding the North American species to the genus Prosartes D.Don, now in the family Liliaceae, Liliales)
 Uvularia L.
 tribe Tripladenieae
 Kuntheria Conran & Clifford
 Schelhammera R.Br.
 Tripladenia D.Don
 tribe Iphigenieae
 Camptorrhiza E.Phillips
 Iphigenia Kunth
 tribe Anguillarieae
 Baeometra Salisb.
 Wurmbea Thunb. (including Neodregea C.H.Wright and Onixotis Raf.)
 tribe Colchiceae
 Colchicum L. (including Androcymbium Willd., Bulbocodium L. and Merendera Ramond)
 Gloriosa L. (including Littonia Hook.)
 Hexacyrtis Dinter
 Ornithoglossum Salisb.
 Sandersonia Hook.

The genus Petermannia F.Muell. is excluded from this family and placed in its own family Petermanniaceae, Liliales. The former controversy regarding the inclusion of Androcymbium in Colchicum has now been resolved in favor of the 2007 classification of Manning et al. who included Androcymbium in Colchicum. This is supported by molecular phylogenetic studies with dense species sampling (i.e. 41 species previously placed in Androcymbium and 96 species of Colchicum) that showed that the type species of Androcymbium, A. melanthioides (Colchicum melanthioides), is more closely related to species of Colchicum than it is to many species traditionally placed in Androcymbium.

Subsequently, Nguyen et al.(2013) proposed reclassifying the family on the basis of subfamilies: 
 Subfamily Uvularioideae (distribution: Eastern Asia and North America)
 Tribe Uvularieae (Disporum, Uvularia)
 Subfamily Wurmbeoideae (distribution: Australia, Africa, Europe, central and tropical Asia) 
 Tribe Burchardieae (Burchardia)
 Tribe Tripladenieae (Tripladenia, Schelhammera, Kuntheria)
 Tribe Iphigenieae (Iphigenia, Camptorrhiza)
 Tribe Angullarieae (Wurmbea, Onixotis, Neodregea, Baeometra)
 Tribe Colchiceae (Gloriosa (including Littonia), Colchicum (including Merendera, Bulbocodium, and probably Androcymbium), Hexacyrtis, Ornithoglossum, Sandersonia

References

Bibliography

External links

Colchicaceae, Uvulariaceae in L. Watson and M.J. Dallwitz (1992 onwards). The families of flowering plants: descriptions, illustrations, identification, information retrieval. Version: Archived version, 9 March 2006
images at PlantSystematics.org
links at CSDL, Texas

 
Liliales families